Why Lady Why may refer to:

Music
 "Why Lady Why" (Alabama song), a 1980 song by Alabama
 "Why Lady Why" (Gary Morris song), a 1984 song by Gary Morris